Peter Fenton may refer to:

Peter Fenton (politician) (1886–1953), Canadian politician
Peter Fenton (venture capitalist) (born 1972), Silicon Valley venture capitalist
Peter Fenton (musician), Australian musician and actor
Peter Fenton (guitarist), (1957) English guitarist of Siouxsie and the Banshees

See also
Fenton (name)